Natrix astreptophora, the red-eyed grass snake, is a species of natricine snake found in the Iberian Peninsula, south of France, and some coastal areas in Maghreb, from Tangier to Tunisia.

References

Natrix
Reptiles described in 1885
Taxa named by Víctor López Seoane